The qualifying rounds for the 2005–06 UEFA Cup began on 14 July 2005. In total, there were two qualifying rounds which narrowed clubs down to 80 teams in preparation for the first round.

Times are CEST (UTC+2), as listed by UEFA (local times, if different, are in parentheses).

First qualifying round

Summary

|-
!colspan="5"|Southern-Mediterranean region
|-

|-
!colspan="5"|Central-East region
|-

|-
!colspan="5"|Northern region
|-

|}

Matches

Match awarded 3–0 to Baskimi due to Žepče fielding an ineligible player

Bashkimi win 4–1 on aggregate

APOEL win 6–0 on aggregate

Rapid București win 10–0 on aggregate

Široki Brijeg win 4–3 on aggregate

1–1 on aggregate, Vardar won on away goals

Omonia won 6–0 on aggregate

Domžale won 8–0 on aggregate

MTZ-RIPO won 3–2 on aggregate

Banants won 4–3 on aggregate

BATE Borisov won 6–0 on aggregate

Vaduz won 2–1 on aggregate

MŠK Žilina won 3–2 on aggregate

Mainz 05 won 4–0 on aggregate

Nistru Otaci won 5–2 on aggregate

Carmarthen Town won 5–3 on aggregate

Cork City won 2–1 on aggregate

B36 won 3–2 on aggregate

Allianssi won 4–1 on aggregate

2–2 on aggregate, Linfield won on away goals

Liepājas Metalurgs won 6–0 on aggregate

Keflavik won 6–0 on aggregate

Viking won 3–1 on aggregate

MyPa won 2–1 on aggregate

4–4 on aggregate, Rhyl won on away goals

Esbjerg won 7–2 on aggregate

Second qualifying round

Summary

|-
!colspan="5"|Southern-Mediterranean region
|-

|-
!colspan="5"|Central-East region
|-

|-
!colspan="5"|Northern region
|-

|}

Matches

Red Star Belgrade win 7–1 on aggregate

Maccabi Petah Tikva win 11–0 on aggregate

Dinamo București win 4–3 on aggregate

2–2 on aggregate, Lokomotiv Plovdiv win on away goals

APOEL win 3–2 on aggregate

2–2 on aggregate, Litex Lovech win on away goals

Beşiktaş win 6–1 on aggregate

Rapid București win 4–1 on aggregate

Levski Sofia win 3–1 on aggregate

Široki Brijeg win 5–2 on aggregate

3–3 on aggregate, Domžale win on away goals

Krylya Sovetov win 4–0 on aggregate

Metalurh Donetsk win 5–1 on aggregate

3–3 on aggregate. Grasshopper win on away goals.

Graz win 3–0 on aggregate

Austria Wien win 4–3 on aggregate

3–3 on aggregate. Zenit Saint Petersburg win on away goals.

Teplice win 3–2 on aggregate

Dyskobolia Grodzisk win 4–1 on aggregate

Dnipro Dnipropetrovsk win 8–2 on aggregate

Zürich win 5–1 on aggregate

Halmstad win 5–3 on aggregate

Midtjylland win 4–3 on aggregate

Brann win 2–0 on aggregate

Genk win 6–2 on aggregate

Viking win 3–1 on aggregate

2–2 on aggregate, MyPa win on away goals

Copenhagen win 4–0 on aggregate

Mainz 05 win 4–0 on aggregate

1–1 on aggregate, Cork City win on away goals

1–1 after extra time, Tromsø win 3–2 on penalties

Notes

References

External links
Qualifying Rounds Information
Qualification and Seeding Information

1
July 2005 sports events in Europe
August 2005 sports events in Europe
UEFA Cup qualifying rounds